The Großbach is a river in the district of Trier-Saarburg in the German state of Rhineland-Palatinate. It has a length of 7.67 kilometres and a catchment area of 27.77 km².

Its right-hand tributaries are the Eselsbach near Greimerath with a length of 6.69 km and a catchment of 8.63 km², the Bingelbach between Greimerath and Zerf with a length of about 1.7 km and the Ellerborn near Oberzerf with a length of 1.54 km and catchment of 1.53 km².

The Großbach discharges into the Ruwer at Niederzerf.

See also
List of rivers of Rhineland-Palatinate

Rivers of Rhineland-Palatinate
Rivers of Germany